Ap'Tin Arhi: I Megaliteres Epitihies is the second box set album, sixth compilation album and eighteenth album overall by popular Greek pop-rock singer Sakis Rouvas, released on 17 August 2007 by Universal Music Greece. The set comprises three CDs and includes a bonus DVD with thirteen videos. The audio collection is a near-complete compilation of Rouvas' first works under the PolyGram Greece record company and included hits from his first five albums (Sakis Rouvas, Min Andistekese, Gia Sena, Aima, Dakrya & Idrotas, and Tora Arhizoun Ta Dyskola) that have been divided into three categories: The Hit Singles, Love Songs, and The Remixes + Rest of the Best.

Album information
The album itself comes in a special rectangular 10"×12.5" packaging, while the artwork, portraying a long-haired Rouvas as an angel is from a popular 1997 photo shoot from the magazine Out! that had become an iconic image at the time, as the music that the album contains is from that era. This compilation is the fifth official compilation from Rouvas' former label and thus includes much of the same music as the other four compilations from Universal Music. However, the past releases have each included a specific theme in their song selection. Me Kommeni Tin Anasa, Rouvas' first greatest hits album, was a collection of a selection of his most successful airplay singles along with remixes and two previously unreleased tracks (One of which was a remix and the other a cover of The Chi-Lites hit "Oh Girl"), the box set Sakis Rouvas was a near-complete audio collection, The Ultimate Collection: Music + Video - 1991–1996 was another collection of the same most successful airplay singles, but to include a bonus DVD (exactly like the one on this album) and Ta Erotika Sakis Rouvas was a collection of his most successful love songs and ballads. However, this collection in one manner collectively sums up the other albums' material and is presented in a special packaging as a collector's item, one decade after Rouvas signed a contract with Minos EMI.

Track listing
CD 1: The Hit Singles

CD 2: Love Songs

CD 3: The Remixes + Rest of the Best

DVD

2007 compilation albums
Albums produced by Nikos Karvelas
Albums produced by Nikos Terzis
Greek-language albums
Music videos directed by Kostas Kapetanidis
Sakis Rouvas video albums
2007 video albums
Music video compilation albums
Sakis Rouvas compilation albums
Universal Music Greece compilation albums
Universal Music Greece video albums